South Korea and North Korea competed in some events at the 2018 Asian Para Games as a unified team, under the title "Korea" (COR). The two Koreas competed under one team in three events; one in swimming and two in table tennis. This marked the first time the two countries compete in para-sport event.

The delegation of the two Koreas marched together in the opening ceremony. South Korean wheelchair fencer Kim Sun-mi and North Korean swimmer Sim Sung-hyok were the joint flag-bearers during the ceremony.

Competitors
The following is a list of the number of competitors representing the unified Korea that participated at the Games:

Unlike Asian Games, athletes also competed under their respective national team in individual events.

Medalists

Swimming
A unified Korean swimming team participated in the men's freestyle relay and mixed relay with South Korean coach Sun Chang-yong mentoring the team.

Men's freestyle relay
 Kwon Yong-hwa (S7 category)
 Lim Woo-geun (SB5)
 Kwon Hyun (S9)
 Jong Guk-song (S9)

Mixed relay 
 Kwon Hyun
 Kwon Yong-hwa
 Lee Dong-gu (S7)
 Kim Sae-hun (S9)
 Jeon Hyung-woo (S9)
 Jong Guk-song
 Sim Song-hyok

Table tennis
Two players each from South and North Korea played for the unified Korea team at the Para Asian Games. Ri Chol-ung of North Korea served as their head coach.

 Park Hong-kyu
 Lee Se-ho 
 Pak Kum-jin
 Kim Yong-rok

See also
 Korea at the 2018 Asian Games

References

2018
Asian Para Games, Korea
Asian Para Games, Korea
Nations at the 2018 Asian Para Games